Peter John Hickman (born 8 April 1987 in Burton-upon-Trent) is an English professional motorcycle racer and business owner for preparation of racing machines.

For 2021, he competed in the British Superbike Championship class aboard a BMW M1000RR, initially with superbike teammate Xavi Forés for new team FHO Racing, formed from some elements of Hickman's old team Smiths Racing, which closed at the end of the 2020 season. He continued with the same team during 2022.

Hickman started TT racing in 2014. He won two in 2018, three in 2019, followed by four in 2022, following the resumption of TT racing after two years of no Isle of Man TT events during COVID-19 travel restrictions. The tally of four wins in one week of racing has only been achieved by two other riders, Phillip McCallen and Michael Dunlop, and Ian Hutchinson who scored five in 2010.

Racing background

Short circuit

Hickman took his first BSB race win at Cadwell Park in 2014. After starting the season without a ride he rode for Tsingtao WK Kawasaki for a single round before joining the RAF Reserves Honda team for the rest of the season at Knockhill.

During 2020, he competed in British Superbikes aboard a BMW S1000RR for Smiths Racing with team-mate Alex Olsen.

Hickman finished 2019 British Superbike Championship season in sixth place, the 2020 season in 14th and 2021 in fifth place.

Isle of Man TT races
In 2022, the record was surpassed by Glenn Irwin, who reached . He prepared for his TT race debut by travelling to the Island  and driving 70 laps of the near-38 mile course in a hire car, and by watching videos. Hickman's father Dave was a Manx Grand Prix winner and entered two TTs.

Hickman clinched his first victory at the Isle of Man TT in a close race from Michael Dunlop and Dean Harrison, breaking Ian Hutchinson's lap record twice in the 2018 Superstock event.

Other UK road races
Hickman achieved his first international road race win at the 2015 Ulster Grand Prix, winning the feature race ahead of Conor Cummins.

Macau Grand Prix
Hickman won the last race of the 2015 season in November, the Macau Grand Prix, riding a Briggs Equipment/RAF Reserves BMW S1000RR.

In November 2016, he retained his Macau Grand Prix title, after he worked his way through from fourth position, winning by just 0.533 seconds from eight-time winner Michael Rutter.

In the 2017 event, Hickman was placed second, in front of event team-mate Michael Rutter, both riding Bathams BMWs.

In 2018 Hickman won the Macau event for a third time, riding his BMW S1000RR prepared by Smiths Racing for Aspire Ho, ahead of Rutter (Bathams Aspire Ho Honda RC213V-S) and Martin Jessop (PBM Ducati).

Superbike World Championship
Peter Hickman was announced as a wild card for the Donington Park event, riding his usual British Superbike BMW M1000RR, with suitable alterations including a World Superbike specification CPU.

Career statistics

British Superbike Championship

Superbike World Championship

Races by year
(key) (Races in bold indicate pole position) (Races in italics indicate fastest lap)

* Season still in progress.

References

External links
 Official Website
 2016 MCE Insurance BSB Championship Profile

English motorcycle racers
Living people
1987 births
British Superbike Championship riders
Isle of Man TT riders
Sportspeople from Burton upon Trent
Superbike World Championship riders